The Quan Outdoor Oven is a 20th-century version of a traditional hotnu, or outside oven, on the island of Guam. This oven is located on Quan family land on J. C. Santos Road, south of Santos Memorial Park in Piti. Although built out of modern materials, it follows a traditional form that has been in use on Guam since these ovens were introduced by the Spanish in the 17th century. The base of the structure is either poured concrete or concrete blocks. The interior of the vault is made out of heat-resistant bricks, while the exterior is finished in concrete. When recorded in 2010, its main opening was damaged.

The oven was listed on the National Register of Historic Places in 2010.

See also
 Baza Outdoor Oven
 Paulino Outdoor Oven
 Won Pat Outdoor Oven
 National Register of Historic Places listings in Guam

References

Buildings and structures on the National Register of Historic Places in Guam
Ovens
Buildings and structures completed in 1947